Tata Hexa is a full-size crossover SUV manufactured by Indian passenger and commercial vehicles manufacturer Tata Motors. The SUV, which was originally unveiled in the 2016 Geneva Motor Show, was launched into the Indian markets in January 2017. Tata Hexa was a heavyily reworked Tata Aria. The overall body shape and dimensions were kept true to the previous Tata Aria.

The Hexa used Tata's Impact design language, also used in Tata Tiago, Tata Tigor, Tata Nexon and the Tata Harrier. The company used its three design studios in India, the UK and Italy for designing cars in this design framework.

The Tata Hexa was available in a number of variants, all of which are differentiated based on cabin features, design aesthetics as well as engine power and torque output. It was also available with an extremely sophisticated AWD system which used inspiration from Land Rovers Software Capabilites.

The Tata Hexa was not well received by the Indian Market and did not manage to make a significant impact on the sales of its closest rivals the Toyota Innova and the Mahindra XUV 500 despite being an overall more premium and complete package.

Variants

References

External links 

 Tata Hexa official site

Hexa
Cars introduced in 2017
2020s cars
Mid-size sport utility vehicles
Rear-wheel-drive vehicles
All-wheel-drive vehicles